The Lockheed X-7 (dubbed the "Flying Stove Pipe") was an American unmanned test bed of the 1950s for ramjet engines and missile guidance technology. It was the basis for the later Lockheed AQM-60 Kingfisher, a system used to test American air defenses against nuclear missile attack.

Early Development
Development of the Kingfisher was first initiated in December 1946. The X-7 was called into production by the United States Air Force requirement for the development of an unmanned ramjet test plane with a top speed of at least .

The X-7 project was developed under the AMC designator MX-883 and was given in the Lockheed in-house designation L-171. The L-171 was initially designated the PTV-A-1 by the USAF but was later designated the X-7 in 1951.  Despite its first launch being a failure, after re-development of the original ramjet, following test flights were successful. A total of 130 X-7 flights were conducted from April 1951 to July 1960.

Purpose
The X-7 laid the foundation for the AQM-60 Kingfisher.  Being the testbed for several yearlong projects, the X-7 underwent many structural changes to adapt more closely for its intended purpose.  The Kingfisher was put up against three surface to air missiles designed to test the capabilities of the X-7; SAM-A-7/MIM-3 Nike Ajax, SAM-A-25/MIM-14 Nike Hercules, and IM-99/CIM-10 Bomarc were the missiles used in the tests.  During the testing of the SAMs, the X-7 outperformed the missiles and a very small number of critical hits were achieved.  Due to pressure and embarrassment of the military, the X-7 project was terminated in the mid-1960s.

Besides the surface to air missile tests, the X-7 project was also used to test communication equipment for acceleration tests, testing aerodynamics, booster propellants, thermodynamics, and parachutes.

Construction
The X-7 was constructed from steel, unlike its successors such as the A-12 and YF-12 which used titanium.  These [X-7] planes had wings constructed from stainless steel and a fuselage made from a nickel alloy. The use of steel was due to the inability of aluminum to endure air friction heating at hypersonic speeds, years before the widespread introduction of titanium.

The engines developed for the X-7/AQM-60 were designed to operate for a short time, to test the design for the CIM-10 Bomarc. They were redesigned with better materials for use on the hypersonic Lockheed D-21 drone launched from the back of a Lockheed M-21, a derivative of the  Lockheed A-12, or from under the wing of a Boeing B-52 Stratofortress.

Launch and Recovery of the X-7

The X-7 was launched at speed release from the underside of either a B-29 or B-50 carrier plane.

The recovery method of the X-7 rocket plane was a new and simple design for a test plane of its kind but functioned as designed. A multi-stage parachute was deployed after the jet had exhausted its fuel, slowing its descent.  Once it had reached the ground, the long metal rod on the end of the nose penetrated the ground, keeping the plane upright and preventing damage to structure of the X-7. In 1954, the modified X-7 underwent significant changes and was renamed the X-7A-3.  The wing shape was altered, and two small boosters were added to the plane, one under each wing. Due to these alterations, the drop method previously used was changed. The previous version was a complicated, bulky under-wing system, while the new design allowed for a simple fuselage-mounted dropping system. This system was used until its final flight in July 1960.

Surviving aircraft 
 X-7 on display at the Aviation Unmanned Vehicle Museum in Caddo Mills, Texas.

Specifications of X-7A-1
 Length: 
 Wingspan: 
 Height: 
 Diameter: 
 Weight: 
 Speed: 
 Ceiling: 
 Range: 
 Booster: Alleghany Ballistics Lab. X202-C3 solid- fuel rocket; 467 kN for 4 seconds.
 Sustainer: Ramjet

Specifications of X-7A-3
 Length: 
 Wingspan: 
 Height: 
 Diameter: 
 Weight: 
 Speed: 
 Ceiling: 
 Range: 
 Booster: X-7A-3/XQ-5: 2x Thiokol XM45 (5KS50000) solid-fuel rocket; 222 kN (50000 lb)
 Sustainer: Ramjet

See also

References

External links

 Q-5/AQM-60
 "Ramjet test missile takes off on supersonic flight." Popular Science, pp. 142–143.
 Lockheed X7-A  – X7-A on display at Aviation Unmanned Vehicle Museum outside Dallas, Texas, United States.

X-007
X-07, Lockheed
Unmanned military aircraft of the United States
Single-engined jet aircraft
Mid-wing aircraft
Ramjet-powered aircraft
Aircraft with auxiliary rocket engines
Aircraft first flown in 1951